List of corvette classes by country during the modern era (post 1940); (see also List of frigate classes and List of frigate classes by country)

Algeria ( Algerian Navy)

Argentina (Argentine Navy) 

 
  (French-built )

Australia (Royal Australian Navy)

Brazil (Brazilian Navy) 

 
 Barroso class

Brunei (Royal Brunei Navy) 

 F2000 class (transferred to Indonesian Navy)

Canada ( Royal Canadian Navy)

China (People's Liberation Army Navy) 

 Type 056

Denmark (Royal Danish Navy) 

 
 Triton class
 HDMS Thetis (ex British )

Ecuador (Ecuadorian Navy)

Egypt (Egyptian Navy) 

 El Suez class (former )
 El Fateh class (Gowind 2500 class)

Finland (Finnish Navy) 

 
  (in development)

France (French Navy) 

  (French rate them as avisos)

Germany (German Navy)

India (Indian Navy)

Indonesia (Indonesian Navy) 
 
 Pattimura class
 
 
 Kapitan Pattimura class

Iraq (Iraqi Navy)

Iran (Islamic Republic of Iran Navy)

Israel (Israeli Navy)

Italy (Marina Militare)

Regia Marina

Marina Militare

Korea, South (Republic of Korea Navy)

Libya (Libyan Navy)

Malaysia (Royal Malaysian Navy)

Mexico (Mexican Navy)

Morocco (Moroccan Navy) 

 Lt. Col. Errhamani class

Myanmar (Myanmar Navy)

Norway (Royal Norwegian Navy) 

 
 
 
  - proposed

Pakistan (Pakistan Navy)

Peru (Peruvian Navy) 

 Velarde (PR-72P) class

Poland (Polish Navy)

Portugal (Portuguese Navy)

Philippines (Philippine Navy)

Romania (Romanian Naval Forces)

Russia / Soviet Union (Russian Navy)

Saudi Arabia (Royal Saudi Navy)

Singapore (Republic of Singapore Navy)

Spain (Spanish Navy)

Sweden (Swedish Navy)

Taiwan (Republic of China Navy) 

 
 Chi Yang class
 Kang Ding class

Thailand (Royal Thai Navy)

Turkey (Turkish Navy) 
 
 
  (ex-French D'Estienne d'Orves class)

United Arab Emirates (United Arab Emirates Navy)

United Kingdom (Royal Navy)

Vietnam ( Vietnamese People's Navy)

See also
 List of corvette and sloop classes of the Royal Navy

References 

Classes